"Disappear" is a song by Australian rock band INXS, the second single taken from their seventh studio album, X (1990). The song was written by Jon Farriss and Michael Hutchence while they were living together in Hong Kong in 1989.

"Disappear" peaked at number eight on the US Billboard Hot 100 in February 1991, becoming the band's seventh and final top-ten single. In Canada, the song reached number one for two weeks. It was a lesser hit on the UK Singles Chart, peaking at number 21 in December 1990. At the APRA Music Awards of 1992 the song won Most Performed Australian Work Overseas.

B-sides
The B-sides are a Coldcut remix of their 1985 hit "What You Need" and a solo composition called "Middle Beast", which was written and performed by bassist Garry Beers.

Track listings

7-inch and cassette single
 "Disappear" – 4:08
 "Middle Beast" – 4:56

Australian CD single
 "Disappear" (extended 12-inch mix) – 6:50
 "What You Need" (Coldcut Force mix) – 6:32
 "Disappear" (7-inch mix) – 4:08
 "Middle Beast" – 4:56

Australian 12-inch single
A1. "Disappear" (extended 12-inch mix) – 6:50
B1. "Middle Beast" – 4:56
B2. "What You Need" (Coldcut Force mix) – 6:32

UK CD single
 "Disappear"
 "Disappear" (extended 12-inch mix)
 "What You Need" (Coldcut Force mix)

Charts

Weekly charts

Year-end charts

References

1990 singles
1990 songs
APRA Award winners
Atlantic Records singles
INXS songs
Mercury Records singles
RPM Top Singles number-one singles
Song recordings produced by Chris Thomas (record producer)
Songs written by Michael Hutchence
Warner Music Group singles
Songs written by Jon Farriss